Phaya Thai (also Phayathai, Phya Thai or Phyathai) may refer to:

Phaya Thai District, one of the 50 districts of Bangkok
Phaya Thai Road, a major road in Bangkok
Phaya Thai BTS Station, a station on the Sukhumvit of the BTS Skytrain
Phaya Thai Airport Link Station, a station on the Suvarnabhumi Airport Link of the State Railway of Thailand
Phaya Thai Railway Station, a train station of the State Railway of Thailand
Phya Thai Palace, a former royal residence located on Ratchawithi Road
Phyathai Hospitals Group, a network of private hospitals in Bangkok, consisting of:
Phyathai 1 Hospital
Phyathai 2 Hospital
Phyathai 3 Hospital